World Class Wrestling Association (WCWA), based out of Dallas, Texas held a number of major professional wrestling super shows under the name Wrestling Star Wars between 1981 and 1989, with five of these being held in 1986.

Wrestling Star Wars (January)

Wrestling Star Wars (January 1986) was a professional wrestling supercard show that was held on January 26, 1986. The show was produced and scripted by the Dallas, Texas based World Class Championship Wrestling (WCCW) professional wrestling promotion and held in their home area, Dallas/Ft. Worth, Texas. 

Several matches from the show were taped for WCCW's television shows and broadcast in the weeks following the show. The show was the 22nd overall show in the "Wrestling Star Wars" event chronology. The show, held at the Fort Worth Convention Center, drew 8,100 spectators out if its estimated 18,000 seat capacity when configured for professional wrestling shows.

Results

Independence Day Star Wars

Independence Day Star Wars (1986) was a professional wrestling supercard show that was held on July 4, 1986. The show was produced and scripted by the Dallas, Texas based World Class Wrestling Association (WCWA) professional wrestling promotion and held in their home area, Dallas, Texas. Several matches from the show were taped for WCWA's television shows and broadcast in the weeks following the show. The show was the 23rd overall show in the "Wrestling Star Wars" event chronology, drawing 11,500 spectators at the Reunion Arena.

Results

Labor Day Star Wars

Labor Day Star Wars (1986) was a professional wrestling supercard show that was held on September 1, 1986. The show was produced and scripted by the Dallas, Texas based World Class Wrestling Association (WCWA) professional wrestling promotion and held in their home area, Dallas/Ft. Worth, Texas. Several matches from the show were taped for WCWA's television shows and broadcast in the weeks following the show. The show was the 24th overall show in the "Wrestling Star Wars" event chronology. The show, held at the Fort Worth Convention Center, drew 5,000 spectators out if its estimated 18,000 seat capacity when configured for professional wrestling shows.

Results

Thanksgiving Star Wars

Thanksgiving Star Wars (1986) was a professional wrestling supercard show that was held on November 27, 1986. The show was produced and scripted by the Dallas, Texas based World Class Wrestling Association (WCWA) professional wrestling promotion and held in their home area, Dallas, Texas. Several matches from the show were taped for WCWA's television shows and broadcast in the weeks following the show. The show was the 25th overall show in the "Wrestling Star Wars" event chronology. The show, held at the Reunion Arena, drew 6,000 spectators out of its approximately 21,000 seat capacity.

Results

Christmas Star Wars

Christmas Star Wars (1986) was a professional wrestling supercard show that was held on December 25, 1986. The show was produced and scripted by the Dallas, Texas based World Class Wrestling Association (WCWA) professional wrestling promotion and held in their home area, Dallas, Texas. Several matches from the show were taped for WCWA's television shows and broadcast in the weeks following the show. The show was the 26th overall show in the "Wrestling Star Wars" event chronology. The show, held at the Reunion Arena, drew 7,000 spectators out of its approximately 21,000 seat capacity.

Results

References

1986 in professional wrestling
World Class Championship Wrestling shows